Ergi Goga (born 25 October 2002) is an Albanian professional footballer who currently play as a left-back for Kategoria e Parë club Erzeni.

References

2002 births
Living people
People from Tirana
People from Tirana County
Albanian footballers
Association football defenders
Kategoria e Parë players
Akademia e Futbollit players
KF Erzeni players